Račinovci is a village in eastern Croatia located southeast of Drenovci, by the border with Bosnia and Herzegovina and Serbia. The population is 700 (census 2011).

Name
The name of the village in Croatian is plural.

See also
 Vukovar-Syrmia County
Cvelferija
racinovci.com.hr

References

Populated places in Vukovar-Syrmia County
Populated places in Syrmia
racinovci.com.hr